Willy Eichenberger (born 24 May 1928) is a Swiss former sprinter. He competed in the men's 200 metres at the 1952 Summer Olympics.

References

External links
 

1928 births
Possibly living people
Athletes (track and field) at the 1952 Summer Olympics
Swiss male sprinters
Olympic athletes of Switzerland
Place of birth missing (living people)